Youssouf Falikou Fofana (born 26 July 1966 in Divo) is an Ivorian former professional footballer who played as a forward for clubs like ASEC Mimosas, AS Cannes, AS Monaco FC, Girondins de Bordeaux, Karşıyaka S.K., Al-Nassr, and the Ivory Coast national team.

Fofana is the sporting director of ASEC Abidjan.

Honours
Monaco
 1991–92 European Cup Winners' Cup runner-up: 1991–92

Ivory Coast
 African Cup of Nations: 1992

References

External links
 Youssouf Fofana: Pure ivory at FIFA.com
 

1966 births
Living people
People from Divo, Ivory Coast
Ivorian footballers
Association football forwards
Ivory Coast international footballers
Ivory Coast under-20 international footballers
Africa Cup of Nations-winning players
1984 African Cup of Nations players
1988 African Cup of Nations players
1990 African Cup of Nations players
1992 African Cup of Nations players
Ligue 1 players
AS Cannes players
AS Monaco FC players
FC Girondins de Bordeaux players
ASEC Mimosas players
Karşıyaka S.K. footballers
Al Nassr FC players
Ivorian expatriate footballers
Ivorian expatriate sportspeople in France
Expatriate footballers in France
Ivorian expatriate sportspeople in Monaco
Expatriate footballers in Monaco
Ivorian expatriate sportspeople in Turkey
Expatriate footballers in Turkey
Ivorian expatriate sportspeople in Saudi Arabia
Expatriate footballers in Saudi Arabia